All I Want Is Everything may refer to:
 All I Want Is Everything (film), a 2013 Indian English film directed by Shital Morjaria and starring Sagari Venkata and Sampada Harkara
 All I Want Is Everything (novel), a book in the Gossip Girls novel series
 "All I Want Is Everything" (Def Leppard song), a 1996 song by Def Leppard from their album Slang
 "All I Want Is Everything" (Bon Jovi song), a song in the Bon Jovi album These Days
 "All I Want Is Everything" (Victoria Justice song), a song in the soundtrack album for the Nickelodeon TV series Victorious